Hamill is a surname of Irish and English origin.

Notable people 
Aaron Hamill (born 1977), Australian rules footballer
Alex Hamill (footballer, born 1961), Scottish footballer
Alex Hamill (footballer, born 1912), Scottish footballer
Billy Hamill (born 1970), American motorcycle speedway rider
Brendan Hamill (disambiguation), several people
Christine Hamill (1923–1956), English mathematician
Christopher Hamill (born 1958), better known as Limahl, lead singer of the 1980s English pop group Kajagoogoo
Claire Hamill (born 1954), English singer-songwriter
David Hamill (born 1957), Queensland Australian Labor Party politician
Desmond Hamill (1936–2013), British television reporter
Dorothy Hamill (born 1956), American figure skater
Harry Hamill (1879–1947), Australian rugby footballer
James A. Hamill (1877–1941), U.S. Representative from New Jersey
Jim Hamill, singer with The Kingsmen and the Oak Ridge Boys
Jamie Hamill (born 1986), Scottish footballer
Joe Hamill (born 1984), Scottish footballer
John Hamill (born 1947), English actor
John Hamill (baseball) (1860–1911), American baseball player
Kate Hamill, American actress and playwright
Matt Hamill (born 1976), American wrestler
Mark Hamill (born 1951), American actor
Mickey Hamill (1889–1943), Irish footballer
Pat Hamill (born 1950), Scottish footballer
Patrick Hamill (1817–1895), U.S. Representative from Maryland
Pete Hamill (1935–2020), American journalist and writer
Peter J. Hamill (c. 1885–1930), American politician
Red Hamill (Robert George Hamill; 1917–1985), Canadian ice hockey player
Rob Hamill (born 1964), New Zealand rower and political candidate
Tommy Hamill (died 1996), Northern Irish footballer
Zach Hamill (born 1988), Canadian ice hockey player

Name history
There are several surnames that are spelt Hamill but are unrelated:
 Ó hÁdhmaill is an ancient Gaelic Irish clan. The name is now rendered most commonly as Hamill.
 Some Scottish Hamills are of Norman origin and are named after a location; Haineville or Henneville in Manche, France, which itself was named from the Germanic personal name Hagano and the Old French ville for 'settlement'. Other Scottish Hamills are of the Irish origin above.
 The English Hamills of Saxon origin are named after a nickname from Middle English, and the Old English "hamel".

See also
Hamel (disambiguation)
Hamill (film), a biographical film about deaf wrestler Matt Hamill
Hamill, South Dakota, a census-designated place in the United States
Hammill, an alternate spelling
Hamilton (name), an alternate spelling

References

Surnames
Surnames of Irish origin
English-language surnames
Scottish surnames
Surnames of Norman origin
Anglicised Irish-language surnames